= Florence Hill Kramer =

American politician

Florence Hill Kramer was an American state legislator in Colorado who represented Denver County. She was a Democrat.

She was married to Henry F. Kramer, who served in the Colorado House of Representatives and died in 1939.
